is a Japanese former volleyball player who competed in the 1992 Summer Olympics and in the 1996 Summer Olympics.

In 1992 she finished fifth with the Japanese team in the Olympic tournament.

Four years later she was eliminated with the Japanese team in the preliminary round of the 1996 Olympic tournament.

External links
 

1966 births
Living people
Japanese women's volleyball players
Olympic volleyball players of Japan
Volleyball players at the 1992 Summer Olympics
Volleyball players at the 1996 Summer Olympics